Kunniyur is a village in Thiruvarur district in, Tamil Nadu, India. It is near the town of Mannargudi.

Demographics 

As per the 2001 census, Kunniyur had a population of 1700 with 864 males and 836 females.

The Kunniyur estate 

The name Kunniyur has become famous because of the last Shri. Kunniyur Sambasiva Iyer.

Notes

References 

 
 

Villages in Tiruvarur district